All the Hits is an album by Keith Martin, released in 2003 on Blockbuster.

Track listing

2003 albums
Keith Martin (musician) albums